Arlene Carol Dahl (August 11, 1925 – November 29, 2021) was an American actress active in films from the late 1940s. She was one of the last surviving stars from the Classical Hollywood cinema era.

She was also an author and entrepreneur. She founded two companies, Arlene Dahl Enterprises and Dahlia, a fragrance company.

Dahl had three children, the eldest of whom is actor Lorenzo Lamas.

Biography

Early life
Dahl was born on August 11, 1925, in Minneapolis, Minnesota, to Idelle and Rudolph Dahl, a Ford Motor dealer and executive. Her parents were both of Norwegian descent. She cited her year of birth as 1928, although her birth record (1925-43442), available through the Minnesota Historical Society, shows she was born on August 11, 1925. An August 13, 2014, article in the New York Social Diary by David Patrick Columbia, titled "Losses and Gains", references her 89th birthday celebration with her husband, children, and family.

As a child, Dahl took elocution and dancing lessons and was active in theatrical events at Margaret Fuller Elementary School, Ramsey Junior High School, and Washburn Senior High School. After graduating from high school, she held such jobs as performing in a local drama group and briefly working as a model for department stores. Dahl's mother was involved in local amateur theatre. Dahl briefly attended the University of Minnesota.

Early career
A year after graduation from high school, Dahl lived in Chicago, where she worked as a buyer for Marshall and Brown. She then traveled to New York and worked as a model for the Walter Thornton Model Agency, where she successfully auditioned for a part in the musical Mr. Strauss Goes to Boston in 1945. This led to her gaining the lead in another play, Questionable Ladies, which was seen by a talent scout from Hollywood.

Dahl had an uncredited bit part in Life with Father (1947). She was promoted to leading lady in My Wild Irish Rose (1947) with Dennis Morgan, a big hit that led to an offer from MGM for a long-term contract.

MGM
Dahl began working for MGM to play a supporting role in her first film, The Bride Goes Wild (1948), starring Van Johnson and June Allyson. She remained there to play the female lead in the Red Skelton comedy A Southern Yankee (1948).

Eagle-Lion hired her to star as the female lead in Reign of Terror (1949). Then at MGM, she acted opposite Van Johnson in Scene of the Crime (1949); Robert Taylor in Ambush (1950); Joel McCrea in The Outriders (1950); Fred Astaire and Skelton in Three Little Words (1950), playing Eileen Percy; and Skelton again in Watch the Birdie (1950). Except for The Outriders, all these movies were profitable for MGM.

MGM gave Dahl the lead in several B movies, such as Inside Straight (1951) and No Questions Asked (1951), both of which flopped.

Adventure films

Dahl was hired by Pine-Thomas Productions to a multi-picture contract. She was cast in Caribbean Gold (1952), a swashbuckler starring John Payne.

She went to Universal-International to co-star with Alan Ladd in a French Foreign Legion story, Desert Legion (1953); then Pine-Thomas used her again in Jamaica Run (1953) and Sangaree (1953). The latter starred Fernando Lamas, whom Dahl would marry.

She supported Bob Hope in the comedy Here Come the Girls (1953). Dahl and Lamas reunited on The Diamond Queen (1953) at Warner Bros.

In 1953, Dahl played Roxanne on stage in a short-lived revival of Cyrano de Bergerac opposite Jose Ferrer.

Dahl played the ambitious Carol Talbot in Woman's World (1954) at Fox, and she was Rock Hudson's leading lady in Universal's adventure war film Bengal Brigade (1954).

She began writing a syndicated beauty column in 1952, and opened Arlene Dahl Enterprises in 1954, marketing cosmetics and designer lingerie.

Dahl began appearing on television, including episodes of Lux Video Theatre (including a 1954 adaptation of Casablanca, wherein she played Ilsa) and The Ford Television Theatre.

Dahl was both a mystery guest (April 25, 1954) and a panelist on the CBS game show What's My Line?. In 1953, she hosted ABC's anthology series The Pepsi-Cola Playhouse.

John Payne and Dahl were reunited in a film noir, Slightly Scarlet (1956), alongside Rhonda Fleming, another red-haired star.

Dahl made some films in England for Columbia: Wicked as They Come (1956) and Fortune Is a Woman (1957). In 1957, she sued Columbia for $1 million, saying the film's advertisements for Wicked as They Come were "lewd" and "degraded" her. A judge threw out the suit.

Dahl hosted the short-lived television series Opening Night (1958) and had the female lead in the adventure movie Journey to the Center of the Earth (1959), opposite James Mason and Pat Boone. She was injured on set making the latter, but it turned out to be one of her most successful films.

1960s
In 1960, she appeared in the TV series Riverboat in the role of Lucy Belle in the episode "That Taylor Affair". The same year, she married Texas oilman Christian Holmes and announced her retirement from acting. The marriage did not last, but Dahl increasingly diversified her work to become a lecturer and beauty consultant while she continued acting.

She had a supporting role in Kisses for My President (1964) and appeared in Land Raiders (1969), The Pleasure Pit (1969), and the French film Du blé en liasses. She also appeared on TV in Burke's Law and Theatre of Stars.

Her focus by now was on business. After closing her company in 1967, she began serving as vice president at the ad agency Kenyon and Eckhardt that same year. In a 1969 interview, she said her old films were "such an embarrassment".

1970s
Dahl also returned to Broadway in the early 1970s, replacing Lauren Bacall in the role of Margo Channing in Applause.

On television, she had a role on the soap opera One Life to Live and guest-starred on Love, American Style, Jigsaw John, Fantasy Island, and The Love Boat. She also made a TV movie, The Deadly Dream (1971). "I like acting," she said in 1978, "but I had better like business better or I'll lose my shirt."

1980s and 1990s

In 1981, Dahl declared personal bankruptcy, with liabilities of almost $1 million and assets of only $623,970. Her chief creditor was the U.S. Small Business Administration, which guaranteed a $450,000 loan for her as an executive in a cosmetic firm. She had lost $163,000 from burglaries of jewelry and furs from her Manhattan apartment, and she earned only $11,367 in 1980 and $10,517 in 1979.

Dahl appeared on ABC's soap opera One Life to Live from 1981 to 1984 as Lucinda Schenck Wilson. The character was planned as a short-term role (she guest-starred from late 1981 to early 1982 and in late 1982), but Dahl later was offered a one-year contract to appear on the series from September 1983 to October 1984. In 1988 she starred in the film A Place to Hide.

Her last feature film role, which followed a hiatus of more than two decades, was in Night of the Warrior (1991). It co-starred her son Lorenzo Lamas.

She entered the field of astrology in the 1980s, writing a syndicated column and later operating a premium phoneline company. Dahl wrote more than two dozen books on the topics of beauty and astrology.

Dahl guest-starred on episodes of shows starring her son, Renegade and Air America.

Business ventures 
In 1951, Dahl began writing for a tri-weekly beauty column for Let's Be Beautiful, a newspaper owned by Chicago Tribune founder Robert McCormick.

In the mid-1950s, Dahl founded Arlene Dahl Enterprises, selling lingerie, nightgowns, pajamas and cosmetics. She invented the Dahl Beauty Cap, a knitted sleeping cap for women.

Dahl began working at Sears Roebuck as director of beauty products in 1970, earning nearly $750,000 annually, but she left in 1975 to found a short-lived fragrance company, Dahlia.

Personal life
Dahl had six husbands:

 Actor Lex Barker. They met in the early 1950s, wed on April 16, 1951, and divorced the following year (Barker later married Lana Turner).
 Actor Fernando Lamas. They married in 1954. In 1958, Dahl and Lamas had their only child, Lorenzo Lamas. Shortly after giving birth to Lorenzo, Dahl slowed and eventually ended her career as an actress, although she still appeared in films and on television occasionally. Dahl and Lamas divorced in 1960.
 Heir to the Fleischmann yeast fortune and oilman Christian R. Holmes.  They married on October 15, 1960, and had one child, Dahl's only daughter, Christina Carole Holmes. She and Holmes were divorced November 29, 1963.
 Russian wine writer and entrepreneur Alexis Lichine.  They were married from 1964 to 1969.
 TV producer-cum-yacht broker Rounsevelle W. "Skip" Schaum. They were married from 1969 to 1976. Her second son, Rounsevelle Andreas Schaum, was born during this marriage.
 Packaging designer Marc Rosen. They were married from 1984 until her death. She divided her time between New York City and West Palm Beach, Florida.

She has six grandchildren (including AJ Lamas and Shayne Lamas) and two great-grandchildren.

She died in her Manhattan apartment on November 29, 2021, at the age of 96.

Filmography

Television work

Radio appearances

Bibliography

Notes

References

External links

 
 
 
 Arlene Dahl profile at Brian's Drive-In Theatre
 Photographs and literature at Virtual-History.com

1925 births
2021 deaths
20th-century American actresses
American film actresses
American soap opera actresses
American stage actresses
American television actresses
Actresses from Minneapolis
American businesspeople in retailing
California Republicans
New York (state) Republicans
American relationships and sexuality writers
American people of Norwegian descent
Metro-Goldwyn-Mayer contract players
University of Minnesota alumni
Writers from Minneapolis
21st-century American women